This is a list of people elected Fellow of the Royal Society in 1935.

Fellows

Neil Kensington Adam
Edward Neville da Costa Andrade
Sir Frederick Grant Banting
Sir Samuel Phillips Bedson
Edmund John Bowen
George Edward Briggs
Herbert Graham Cannon
John Stuart Foster
James de Graaff-Hunter
Sir Wilfrid Edward le Gros Clark
Arthur Lewis Hall
William Herbert Hatfield
Sir Bernard Augustus Keen
Sir Rudolph Albert Peters
John Read
Redcliffe Nathan Salaman
Robert Stoneley

Foreign members
Irving Langmuir
Max Wilhelm Carl Weber

Statute 12 
Walter Elliot Elliot

1935
1935 in science
1935 in the United Kingdom